Robert Clark Morgan (13 March 1798 – 23 September 1864) was an English sea captain, whaler, diarist, and, in later life, a missionary. He captained the Duke of York, bringing the first settlers to South Australia in 1836.  His life in the British whaling industry has been recorded in the book The Man Who Hunted Whales (2011) by Dorothy M. Heinrich. His diaries are held in the State Library of New South Wales.

Birth
Morgan was born on 13 March 1798 at Deptford, Kent, in England. This is recorded in his diary. His parentage is not known. No conclusive record of his birth has been found.

In his diary he does not mention his parentage apart from a few cryptic remarks. On Sunday 5 February 1837 he states, "I could not say that I had a praying Father or a praying mother or a Brother or Sister for I lost them young and knew little of them. I was cast on the world at the age of 11 years to walk the journey of life".

Religious awakening
About ten days before sailing on his first command, he happened upon a revival meeting, and the result to him was eventful. This would have been in 1828. That revival service in Greenwich was led by Isaac English (baker and lay preacher). 

Before he took up his first command in December 1828 on the Sir Charles Price he had been a reckless, boisterous profligate, living without a thought of God, except to blaspheme his holy name; but Divine grace now wrought so wondrous a change in him, that when he once more went to sea the old hands amongst his crew could scarcely recognise him for the same man. He who once never gave a command unaccompanied by an oath was now never heard to swear; and such was the force of his character and the power of his example, that in a few months' time not a man of his crew dared to use a profane expression while within his hearing. The discipline of the ship was not a bit lessened, and every one was happier, from the sobriety and good feeling of which the captain set example.

Robert Clark Morgan attended the West Greenwich Wesleyan Methodist Chapel, which was founded in King George Street, very close to Blissett Street, in 1816. The foundation stone of the Wesleyan Chapel in George Street was laid in September 1816 and it was opened on December sixteenth of the same year. It was capable of seating 1,000 people. The building may still be there although it has not been used as a chapel for a very long time.

Wife and family
On 30 December 1822, at Deptford, Kent, at the Church of St. Nicholas, Robert Clark Morgan married Mary Dorrington. He was 25 and she was 22. He had a lifelong devotion to her. He states that they met when very young - the choice of my youth is an expression he often used in his diaries.

The marriage was registered as:

Robert Morgan Clark, bachelor of this Parish and Mary Dorrington, spinster of ('this', written, then deleted) the Parish of Greenwich were married in this Church by Banns this 30th Day of December in the Year one thousand eight hundred and twenty two, by me, D. Jones, Curate.

This Marriage was solemnised between us (signed:) Robert Morgan Clark
Mary Dorrington

In the presence of { X The mark of James Gittens and
{Elizabeth Dorrington

The reason his marriage was solemnised in the surname of Clark is unknown.

They had seven children, most dying shortly after birth. There was a daughter, Louisa Clark Morgan, who died at 7 years of age and only one child, also named Robert Clark Morgan, survived the Captain and his wife. Both were baptised at the George Street Wesleyan chapel.

Royal Navy
He entered the Royal Navy at the age of eleven, his diaries state that at that age (he was) sent to sea on board a man o' war. He talks of the man o' war as "a place where all wickedness is committed with greediness and a place where he saw every vice man is capable of committing".

South Sea whaling

When he left the Royal Navy, in 1814 towards the end of the Napoleonic Wars, he transferred to the merchant marine, whaling. One of the voyages on Phoenix is described in the book The Dalton Journal edited by Niel Gunson. Morgan is not mentioned by name. However, there is a reference to the second mate, which Morgan would have been at that time.

She was the first pioneer ship to reach South Australia.

His whaling career in the Phoenix was: Apprentice June 1814 - June 1819, Able Seaman June 1819 - Sept 1822, second Mate Jan 1823 - Nov 1825, first Mate May 1826 - Sept 1828. Sir Charles Price, Master Dec 1828 - June 1831. Recovery, Master Dec 1831 - June 1835. Duke of York, Master Feb 1836 - Aug 1837.

In his diary later in life he reminisces about his whaling experiences:

Early this morning I went on deck. It was a fine beautiful morning, a clear atmosphere and fine blue sky with the ocean with only a few rippling over its surface. I saw a ship and went to the masthead and saw she had her boats down. Afterwards I saw the sperm whales she was after. She had taken whales before as she was boiling oil and the smoke was going in volleys from her tryworks. The whales were going as nearly as fast as the ship so we kept pace with them for 2 - 3 hours till at last one boat struck a large whale then another struck the same whale and eventually killed it and took it alongside.

Oh how vivid did this bring back all my past experience in this work. The days of my youth and manhood was spent in this trade. This was the part of it I loved. A sight of a whale would make my heart jump and take away all relish for food. How happy if when a boy I could get to be let down in a boat and after I came to manhood how happy if I could but get to kill a whale and I always managed to get my share. All these things came fresh to my memory and these feelings rose up and caused a feeling not easily described, but I left it all for Jesus and his work. I will not repine how many hairs breaths escapes have I had in whaling, how many times has God spared my life when my boat has been staven, time after time.

South Australia
The South Australian Company  had fitted her to take the first settlers to South Australia, and then go whaling after that. Duke of York sailed from St Katharine Docks on 26 February 1836. Duke of York finally set sail for the sea on Saturday 19 March 1836, having been unable to get away from the English coast due to bad weather for some five weeks. She carried 42 persons including the crew. (Another source said she left England on 5 April). 

Some passengers, including some adults whose passage was charged to the Emigration Fund, were on board as well. The First Report of the Commissioners of Colonisation of South Australia gave the ship's complement as thirty-eight. A list compiled from the Company's records gave the names of twenty passengers and twenty-six seamen, in addition to the Captain.

Several of the passengers listed had significant appointments in the service of the South Australian Company. Samuel Stephens was the first Colonial Manager, and on behalf of his employers, he established the settlement of Kingscote as a site for their projected whaling venture. From its location in relation to the mouth of the River Murray, and the Gulfs of St Vincent and Spencer, he considered it as a possible shipping port for the future.

Another of the passengers, Thomas Hudson Beare, was Superintendent of Buildings and Labourers, while D.H. Schreyvogel was engaged as a clerk. Charles Powell and W. West were gardeners; Henry Mitchell was a butcher; and John Neale was an assistant carpenter.

They reached Kangaroo Island in South Australia and disembarked on 27 July 1836. When in sight of the island the previous evening Captain Morgan, a devout Wesleyan, gathered the passengers for a prayer meeting. When they landed Samuel Stephens named the river Morgan; it is now called Cygnet. Soon after landing Stephens conducted a short service to give thanks for their safe arrival. This was probably the first religious service on the shores of South Australia.

Most of the passengers wished to be the first to land in the new colony, but Captain Morgan settled the dispute very cleverly. He instructed the second mate Robert Russell to have some sailors row the youngest child ashore. This was two and a half year old Elizabeth Beare, daughter of the Company's Deputy Manager, Thomas Hudson Beare. Russell was instructed to carry the child through the shallow water and place her feet on the beach while the adults were at dinner. In doing so she was the first white female to set foot on that strand. When this happened the crew began to cheer and the passengers soon realised that a landing had been made without them knowing it.

After leaving Kangaroo Island Duke of York sailed on 20 September 1836 to hunt whales. She was at Hobart Town from 27 September 1836 to 18 October to refresh; from there she proceeded to the South Sea whaling grounds. On Friday, 10 February 1837 Morgan heard of the wreck of the ship Active in the Fiji Islands and they took on board its Master, Captain Dixon, Willings the mate, and Wilkey.

Duke of York was whaling up the coast of Queensland when she was shipwrecked off Port Curtis (in Queensland) on 14 July 1837. Port Curtis is near current day Gladstone, Queensland. The whole ship's company got into three boats and rowed and sailed 300 miles to Brisbane, where they arrived Saturday 26 August 1837 after a most uncomfortable time. On the way down aboriginals killed an English crewman George Glansford, of Barking Essex, and a Rotumah native boy, named Bob, when the boats put in for water. There are parts of Morgan's diary that related to George's death. The Captain said that he was a young man, probably, early 20s. The Captain used to get George down to his cabin for religious instruction. He said that he recalled the Captain writing that George was not a hardened rough type. George apparently accepted his religious teaching. It seems as the captain had a sort of parental role over George. His journal that covers the period that he was master of Duke of York is water marked to attest to this experience.

They finally arrive at Morton Bay and the steamer James Watt took Captain Morgan, the mate and nineteen survivors on to Sydney, leaving the remainder to follow in another vessel.

London Missionary Society
On Tuesday, 6 February 1838, three days after he arrived home from Sydney, he visited the Secretary of the London Missionary Society to see if he could take command of the missionary ship Camden. On 10 February he met the missionary John Williams, who was looking to travel back to Samoa with his wife Mary.

Morgan sailed in the Pacific in Camden from April 1838 till July 1843. He was with Williams in 1839 when Williams and Harris were murdered in the New Hebrides island of Erromango, now Vanuatu. The London Missionary Society invited children all over the country to contribute to buying a ship in Williams's memory so that his work could continue. Seven mission ships named John Williams were successively bought in this way.

When Camden returned to England, Morgan became captain of the London Missionary Society's first such ship, John Williams, and sailed it for 3 voyages: June 1844 - May 1847, October 1847 - May 1850 and July 1851 - June 1855.

In 1841 the Samoan Brethren suggested that he sit for his portrait  when next in Sydney. However, it was finally done in London. The original artwork is held in the collections of the National Maritime Museum, Greenwich, England, and was displayed in the offices of the London Missionary Society. There was a copy reproduced in the journal The Congregationalist (June 1962 at p. 3) with an article about him.

Retirement from the sea
Captain Morgan retired from the sea at the end of the voyage in 1855.

As far as can be seen in his diary that covers the period from 16 June 1861 - 29 March 1862  he spent a lot of his time visiting the sick.

His final diary that covers the period 15 March 1863 to 31 March 1864 tells of the voyage the Captain and Mrs Morgan made to Melbourne, Australia on the Yorkshire from about 30 March 1863 to 19 June 1863. It appears they came to be near their only surviving child (Robert Clark Morgan II). The son was baptised on 10 July 1829 at the Wesleyan Chapel George St. Greenwich. In the 1851 census Robert Clark Morgan II (aged 21) was residing in England with his patents at 83A Lower Road Deptford (also in the household was Mary A Wallace, niece, aged 22, born in Greenwich, Kent). His occupation is shown as a clerk at the East India Docks. He had lived in Samoa with his parents for a while and went to Sydney in 1849. He then went to Melbourne arriving in about 1852 at the time of the gold rush. He joined the Victorian civil service on 20 September 1852 as a revenue collector. He died in Melbourne, Australia at the age of 87 years a very wealthy man.

Death
Morgan died 23 September 1864 at Arthur St, South Yarra, Victoria, Australia, at the home of his son, aged 66.

His dying words are that when he was asked by his son if he wanted anything was: "I want more love, more love to the Father, more love to the Son and more love to the Holy Spirit".

The headstone reads:

Sacred to the memory of Robert Clark Morgan who died 23 September 1864, aged 66. He brought the first settlers to South Australia in the Duke of York in 1836 and was subsequently Commander of the London Missionary Ships Society's Camden and John Williams. His consecrated life made him a true Missionary and he was much beloved by the natives of the South Pacific. So he bringeth them into their desired heven.

And on the other side of the headstone –

Also of Mary his beloved wife who died 12 February 1866 aged 64 years, and their daughter Maria Clark who died 18 October 1843, aged 7 years. Precious the sight of the Lord is the death of His Saints

The Reverend A.W. Murray in his book, Forty Years Mission Work, said "I have known many eminent Christians during my not-short life, but I have never met a more lovable, a more Christian like man than was Captain Morgan"

On 12 February 1866, Mary Morgan (née Dorrington) his wife, died at Arthur Street.

On her death certificate it said she was born at Greenwich, Kent. Mary and her husband Captain Morgan are buried in the Melbourne General Cemetery with their son Robert Clark Morgan II and his wife Martha Jane (née Short).

Notes

References
  Heinrich, Dorothy M. The Man Who Hunted Whales
 Gill, Thomas. A Biographical Sketch of Colonel William Light, the Founder of Adelaide and the First Surveyor-general of the Province of South Australia: Founder of Adelaide: Sailor, Soldier, Artist and the First Surveyor-General of South Australia , Royal Geographical Society of Australasia, South Australian Branch.
 Newcomb, Harvey. A Cyclopedia of Missions: Containing a Comprehensive View of Missionary Operations Throughout the World : with Geographical Descriptions, and Accounts of the Social, Moral, and Religious Condition of the People”
 Williams, John. A Narrative of Missionary Enterprises in the South Sea Islands: With Remarks Upon the Natural History of the Islands, Origin, Languages, Traditions, and Usages of the Inhabitants. Printed by George Baxter.
 O'Connell, James F.  Riesenberg, Saul H. A Residence of Eleven Years in New Holland and the Caroline Islands.
 Annual Report Society for Nautical Research (London, England)
 Christian Work; or, The News of the Churches
 Christianity in Polynesia: A Study and a Defence, Joseph King, Joseph Hillery King
 Cyclopædia of Christian missions: Their Rise, Progress, and Present Position, John Logan Aikman
 Dalton, William: The Dalton journal : two whaling voyages to the South seas, 1823 - 1829 / ed. by Niel Gunson; [Sydney] : National Library of Australia, 1990 
 Edward Gibbon Wakefield: Builder of the British Commonwealth, Paul Bloomfield
 Erromanga: The Martyr Isle, H. A. Robertson, John Fraser
 Evangelical Magazine and Missionary Chronicle
 Facts and incidents in the life and ministry of Thomas Northcote Toller, Thomas Coleman
 Foreign Missionary Chronicle
 Forty Years Mission Work, Reverent A.W. Murray,
 Founders & Pioneers of South Australia: Life Studies of Edward Gibbon Wakefield, Charles Sturt, George Fife Angas, Sir John Hindmarsh, William Light, George Gawler, David McLaren, Augustus Kavel, and Francis Cadell, Archibald Grenfell Price
 From Jerusalem to Irian Jaya: A Biographical History of Christian Missions, Ruth Tucker, 
 Gems from the Coral Islands: Western Polynesia: Comprising the New Hebrides Group, the Loyalty Group, New Caledonia Group, William Gill, William Wyatt Gill
 Gems from the Coral Islands; Or, Incidents of Contrast Between Savage and Christian Life of the South Sea Islanders, William Gill, of Rartonga
 George Baxter (colour Printer) His Life and Work: A Manual for Collectors, Charles Thomas Courtney Lewis
 Great missionaries: a series of biographies, Andrew Thomson
 History of the Establishment and Progress of the Christian Religion in the Islands of the South Sea: With Preliminary Notices of the Islands and of Their Inhabitants, Sarah Tappan Smith, A. S.
 History of the Propagation of Christianity Among the Heathen Since the Reformation, William Brown
 John Howard Angas: Pioneer, Pastoralist, Politician and Philanthropist, H. T. Burgess
 John Williams Missionary https://web.archive.org/web/20091028041158/http://www.geocities.com/summerhillroad2002/john_williams.htm
 Ellis, James J. John Williams: The Martyr Missionary of Polynesia.
 Journal of the Polynesian Society
 Lights and Shadows of Sailor Life, as Exemplified in Fifteen Years' Experience, Including the More Thrilling Events of the U.S. Exploring Expedition, and Reminiscences of an Eventful Life on the "mountain Wave.": As Exemplified in Fifteen Years' Experience, Including the More Thrilling Events of the U. S. Exploring Expedition, and Reminiscences of an Eventful Life on the "Mountain Wave", Joseph G. Clark, 
 Lives of the Leaders of the Church Universal, from Ignatius to the Present Time, Ferdinand Piper, Henry Mitchell MacCracken
 London missionary society Catalogue of Engraved Portraits, D. R. Meyers
 Man on the Ocean, Robert Michael Ballantyne
 Martha Dryland: or, Strength in quietness, memorials of a Sunday-school teacher, James Spence, Martha Dryland
 Memoirs of the Life of the Rev. John Williams, Missionary to Polynesia, Ebenezer Prout
 Memoirs of the Rev. John Pyer, John Pyer, K. P. Russell
 Misi Gete: John Geddie Pioneer Missionary to the New Hebrides, R. S. Miller, John Geddie, Presbyterian Church of Tasmania
 Mission to the Islands: The Missionary Voyages in Bass Strait of Canon Marcus Brownrigg, 1872–1885, Marcus Brownrigg, Stephen Murray-Smith
 Missionary enterprise in many lands, by H.L.L., Jane Laurie Borthwick
 Missionary heroes (in islands of the Pacific), Alexander Williamson
 Missionary Life in Samoa: As Exhibited in the Journals of the Late George Archibald Lundie, During the Revival in Tutuila in 1840-41, George Archibald Lundie, Mary Grey Lundie Duncan
 Missionary Life in the Southern Seas, James Hutton
 Prout, Ebenezer. Missionary Ships Connected With the London Missionary Society
 Missions in Western Polynesia: Being Historical Sketches of These Missions, from Their Commencement in 1839 to the Present Time, Archibald Wright Murray, London Missionary Society
 Modern Missions: Their Trials and Triumphs: Their Trials and Triumphs, Robert Young, 
 Nature and the Godly Empire: Science and Evangelical Mission in the Pacific, 1795–1850, Sujit Sivasundaram, 
 Nineteen Years in Polynesia: Missionary Life, Travels, and Researches in the Islands of the Pacific, George Turner
 Of Islands and Men: Studies in Pacific History, Henry Evans Maude
 Pearls of the Pacific: Being Sketches of Missionary Life and Work in Samoa and Other Islands in the South Seas, Victor Arnold Barradale, London Missionary Society
 Philosophical Magazine: A Journal of Theoretical, Experimental and Applied Physics
 Pioneers and Founders, Or, Recent Workers in the Mission Field: Or recent workers in the mission field, Charlotte Mary Yonge
 Pioneers of the Christian faith, Alexander Gruar Forbes
 Proceedings - Royal Geographical Society of Australasia. South Australian Branch, Royal Geographical Society of Australasia South Australian Branch, Francis Edwards
 Puritans in the South Seas, Louis Booker Wright, Mary Isabel Fry
 Quarterly Journal, Baxter Society, London
 Report of the Directors to the General Meeting of the Missionary Society, London Missionary Society
 Robert Clark Morgan (1798–1864) His personal Diary http://www.catalog.slsa.sa.gov.au:1083/record=b1007037
 Selections from the Autobiography of the Rev. William Gill: Being Chiefly a Record of His Life as a Missionary in the South Sea Islands, William Gill
 South Australian Exploration to 1856, Gwenneth Williams
 Sunday at Home, published 1874
 Ten Decades: The Australian Centenary Story of the London Missionary Society, Joseph King, London Missionary Society
 The Australian Christian Commonwealth, published 1913
 The Australian Encyclopædia, Arthur Wilberforce Jose, Herbert James Carter, Thomas George Tucker
 The Biblical review, and Congregational magazine [formerly The Congregational magazine
 The British Museum Catalogue of Printed Books, 1881–1900, British Museum Dept. of Printed Books, Association of Research Libraries
 The Children's missionary newspaper [sometimes entitled The Children's monthly missionary newspaper] ed. by C.H. Bateman
 The Christian guardian (and Church of England magazine)
 The Christian Miscellany, and Family Visiter
 The Christian reformer; or, Unitarian magazine and review [ed. by R. Aspland], Robert Aspland
 The Christian Treasury (and missionary review)
 The Chronicle, London Missionary Society, London Missionary Society
 The Early History of South Australia: A Romantic Experiment in Colonization, 1836–1857
 The Eclectic Review, vol. 1-New [8th], William Hendry Stowell
 The Encyclopædia of Missions: Descriptive, Historical, Biographical, Statistical. With a Full Assortment of Maps, a Complete Bibliography, and Lists of Bible Versions, Edwin Munsell Bliss
 The Evangelical Magazine and Missionary Chronicle
 The Evangelical Register: A Magazine for Promoting the Spread of the Gospel
 The Foreign Missionary
 The Gospel in All Lands, Methodist Episcopal Church Missionary Society
 The History of the British and Foreign Bible Society: From Its Institution in 1804, to the Close of Its Jubilee in 1854 : Compiled at the Request of the Jubilee Committee, George Browne
 The History of the London Missionary Society, 1795–1895, Richard Lovett
 The history of the London Missionary Society, William Ellis
 The Journal of the Polynesian Society, Polynesian Society (N.Z.)
 The Juvenile messenger of the Presbyterian Church in England
 The Juvenile Missionary Magazine (and Annual), London Missionary Society
 The Last Martyrs of Eromanga: Being a Memoir of the Rev. George N. Gordon and Ellen Catherine Powell, His Wife,  N. Gordon, James D. Gordon, Ellen C. Gordon, J. D.
 The Life of John Williams: Missionary to the South Seas, John Williams
 The Local Preachers' Magazine and Christian Family Record: For the Year, Wesleyan Methodist Local Preachers Mutual Aid Association
 The London, Edinburgh, and Dublin Philosophical Magazine and Journal of Science
 The Magazine of Natural Philosophy
 The Mariners' Church Gospel Temperance Soldiers' and Sailor's Magazine, Temperance British and Foreign Seamen, Soldiers' and Steamers' Friend Society, Bethel Flag Union
 The Martyr Missionary of Erromanga: Or, The Life of John Williams, who was Murdered and Eaten by the Savages in One of the South Sea Islands, Ebenezer Prout
 The martyrs of Polynesia memorials of missionaries, native evangelists, and native converts, who have died by the hand of violence, from 1799 to 1871: Memorials of Missionaries, Native Evangelists, and Native Converts, who Have Died by the Hand of Violence, from 1799 to 1871, Archibald Wright Murray
 The martyrs of Polynesia, memorials of missionaries [&c.] 1799 to 1871, Archibald Wright Murray
 The Missionary Chronicle
 The Missionary Herald, American Board of Commissioners for Foreign Missions
 The Missionary Magazine and Chronicle, London Missionary Society
 The Missionary repository for youth, and Sunday school missionary magazine
 The Missionary Review of the World
 The Mitchell Library, Sydney: Historical and Descriptive Notes, Mitchell Library, Sydney, Ida Leeson
 The New Hebrides and Christian missions, with a sketch of the labour traffic, and notes of a cruise through the group in the mission vessel: With a Sketch of the Labour Traffic, and Notes of a Cruise Through the Group in the Mission Vessel, Robert Steel
 The New Hebrides and the emergence of condominium
 The Picture Printer of the Nineteenth Century, George Baxter, 1804–1867: George Baxter, 1804–1867, Charles Thomas Courtney Lewis
 The Pilot, or Sailors' magazine. [Continued as] Sailors' magazine, British and foreign sailors' society, Sailors' magazine
 The Presbyterian review and religious journal
 The Reformed Presbyterian and Covenanter, John W. Sproull, Thomas Sproull, David Burt Willson, James McLeod Willson
 The Reformed Presbyterian magazine. Jan. 1855-July 1858, 1862–76
 The return to England of the missionary ship, 'John Williams;' containing an account of her voyages as related by captain Morgan [and others],  R C Morgan and others
 The Scottish Congregational magazine [afterw.] The Scottish Congregationalist. New ser., vol.3-10, new [3rd] ser., vol.6- new [7th], Congregational union of Scotland
 The Story of the L.M.S.: With an Appendix Bringing the Story Up to the Year 1904, Charles Silvester Horne
 The Story of the Lifu Mission: Illust., S. McFarlane
 The Sunday at Home: A Family Magazine for Sabbath Reading
 The Sunday school magazine, and journal of Christian instruction. [Continued as] The Sunday school magazine. third ser. 1841-July 1850
 The vanguard of the Christian army; or, Sketches of missionary life, by the author of 'Great voyagers', Christian Army
 The Wesleyan-Methodist Magazine
 To Live Among the Stars: Christian Origins in Oceania, John Garrett
 Trade, Tactics, and Territory: Britain in the Pacific, 1783–1823, Margaret Steven
 Wonders in the Western Isles: Being a Narrative of the Commencement and Progress of Mission Work in Western Polynesia, Archibald Wright Murray

1798 births
1864 deaths
English Congregationalist missionaries
Congregationalist missionaries in French Polynesia
Congregationalist missionaries in Samoa
Congregationalist missionaries in the Cook Islands
Congregationalist missionaries in Vanuatu
History of South Australia
British people in whaling
British expatriates in Samoa
British expatriates in the Cook Islands
British expatriates in Vanuatu
British expatriates in French Polynesia
Australian people in whaling
Sailors from London
People from Deptford